The 2010–11 WNBL season was the 31st season of competition since its establishment in 1981. A total of 10 teams contested the league. The regular season was played between 9 October 2010 and 13 March 2011, followed by a post-season involving the top five in March 2011. The Canberra Capitals were the two-time defending champions, but were defeated in the Grand Final by the Bulleen Boomers.

Broadcast rights were held by free-to-air network ABC. ABC broadcast one game a week, at 1:00PM at every standard time in Australia. Sponsorship included iiNet, entering its first year as league naming rights sponsor. Spalding provided equipment including the official game ball, with Champion supplying team apparel.

Team standings

Finals

Season award winners

Statistics leaders

References

2010-11
2010–11 in Australian basketball
Aus
basketball
basketball